Gonzalo Ariel Sosa (born 4 January 1989) is an Argentine footballer who plays as a striker for Chilean Primera División side Audax Italiano.

Career
A product of Unión de Santa Fe's youth system, Sosa made his professional debut in Atlanta and then played for several clubs at minor categories in Argentina. In 2017, he moved to Chile and joined Magallanes in the Primera B. In 2019, he joined Deportes Melipilla, getting the promotion to the Chilean Primera División for the 2021 season.

Honours

Club
Atlanta
 Primera B Metropolitana (1): 2010–11

Sportivo Italiano
 Primera C Metropolitana (1): 2013-14

Individual
 Primera B de Chile Top Goalscorer: 2020 
 Primera División de Chile Top Goalscorer: 2021

References

External links
 
 
 Gonzalo Sosa at playmakerstats.com (English version of ceroacero.es)

1989 births
Living people
Footballers from Santa Fe, Argentina
Argentine footballers
Argentine expatriate footballers
Club Atlético Atlanta footballers
Barracas Central players
Club Atlético Colegiales (Argentina) players
Gimnasia y Esgrima de Concepción del Uruguay footballers
Guaraní Antonio Franco footballers
Deportes Magallanes footballers
Magallanes footballers
Deportes Melipilla footballers
Mazatlán F.C. footballers
Primera B Metropolitana players
Torneo Federal A players
Primera B de Chile players
Chilean Primera División players
Liga MX players
Expatriate footballers in Chile
Argentine expatriate sportspeople in Chile
Expatriate footballers in Mexico
Argentine expatriate sportspeople in Mexico
Association football forwards